The Battle of Haynau was fought on 26 May 1813, between Prussian cavalry under the command of General Gebhard Leberecht von Blücher and a French infantry division under the command of General Nicolas Joseph Maison. The battle resulted in a Prussian victory.

Prelude
After their defeat at the Battle of Bautzen (20–21 May), the allies broke off the action at their own time and retired in such good order that Napoleon failed to capture a single trophy as proof of his victory. The enemy's escape annoyed him greatly, the absence of captured guns and prisoners reminded him too much of his Russian experiences, and he redoubled his demands on his corps commanders for greater vigour in the pursuit.

Battle
Napoleon's entreaties led his corps commanders to push on without due regard to tactical precautions, and Blücher took advantage of their carelessness. On 26 May, with some twenty squadrons of Landwehr cavalry, he surprised, rode over and almost destroyed Maison's division. The material loss inflicted on the French was not very great, but its effect in raising the morale of the raw Prussian cavalry and increasing their confidence in their old commander was, enormous. On the other hand, they had to suffer the loss of the commanding cavalry officer Florens von Bockum-Dolffs (1769–1813), who had led the charge himself.

Monument
Like on all other battlegrounds a small monument was erected. This has been destroyed by Polish forces in 1945.

Notes

References
 
 
Attribution:

External links
 

Battles of the War of the Sixth Coalition
Battles of the Napoleonic Wars
Conflicts in 1813
May 1813 events